Paraemheb (Pre'em'hab) was a vizier of ancient Egypt. He served during the reign of Amenmesse and Sethi II.

References

Ancient Egyptian viziers
Nineteenth Dynasty of Egypt